Bhaskara Appaji Agnihotri (also popularly known as Hari Bhaskara Agnihotri), a 17th-century Sanskrit scholar known for his work of anatomy entitled "Sharira Padmini" in 1735. He also composed a work by the name "Padyamritatarangini" in 1676 and a work entitled "Smritiprakasa". He was born in a Deshastha Rigvedi Brahmin (DRB) family of scholars and was the son of Appaji Hari Agnihotri who was also a scholar of grammar.

Works
This is the list of his works:
Sharira Padmini
Padyamritatarangini
Smritiprakasa
Paribhāṣābhāskara

References

External links

Indian Sanskrit scholars
Year of death unknown
Year of birth unknown
17th-century Indian scholars